Ancuty  ( Antsuty) is a village in the administrative district of Gmina Narew, within Hajnówka County, Podlaskie Voivodeship, in north-eastern Poland.

The village has a population of 80.

References

Ancuty